Tom Leaper (born 7 November 1975) is a former Australian racing cyclist. He finished in second place in the Australian National Road Race Championships in 1998.

References

External links

1975 births
Living people
Australian male cyclists
Cyclists from Melbourne